Tor Sigbjørn Utsogn (born 1 April 1974) is a Norwegian politician for the Progress Party.

He served as a deputy representative to the Parliament of Norway from Vest-Agder during the term 2009–2013. He met during 213 days of parliamentary session. Locally he has been a member of Kristiansand city council.

References

1974 births
Living people
Deputy members of the Storting
Progress Party (Norway) politicians
Politicians from Kristiansand
Place of birth missing (living people)
21st-century Norwegian politicians